The General Statistics Office of Vietnam (GSO), sometimes written in English as General Statistics Office of Viet Nam, serves under the Ministry of Planning and Investment (Vietnam) (MPI) realizing the function as an adviser for the MPI Minister in state management for statistics; conducting statistical activities and providing social and economic information to organizations and individuals domestically and internationally in accordance with the law.

Organizational structure and finance
The General Statistics Office is headed by the Director General, overseeing multiple departments, 63 provincial statistical offices, and 684 district statistical offices.

Departments
System of National Accounts Department;
Statistical Methodology Standard and IT Department;
Integrated Statistics Department;
Industrial Statistics Department;
Agricultural, Forestry & Fishery Statistics Department;
Trade and Services Statistics Department;
Population & Labor Statistics Department;
Social and Environmental Statistics Department;
Foreign Statistics and International Cooperation Department;
Human Resources Department;
Financial Planning Department;
Statistics Legislation and Inspection Department;
Administration Office;
Price Statistics Department.
Construction and Capital Investment Statistics Department.

Public delivery service agencies

Institute of Statistical Science;
Statistical Informatics Center No 1;
Statistical Informatics Center No 2;
Statistical Informatics Center No 3;
Statistical Documentation and Service Center;
College of Statistics (in Bac Ninh province);
College of Statistics No2 (in Dong Nai province);
Statistical Forms and Questionnaire Distribution Company;
Ho Chi Minh City Statistical Printing Enterprise;
Statistical Publishing House;
Figures and Events Journal.

Notes

References

Vietnam
Governmental office in Hanoi